The 2020 Supercars Championship (known for commercial reasons as the 2020 Virgin Australia Supercars Championship) was a motor racing series for Supercars. It was the twenty-second running of the Supercars Championship and the twenty-fourth series in which Supercars have contested the Australian Touring Car Championship, the premier title in Australian motorsport. Due to disruption caused by the COVID-19 pandemic, a number of rounds were rescheduled or cancelled.

The series reverted to having only two manufacturers, Ford and Holden, for the first time since 2012 with Nissan no longer being represented on the grid.

Scott McLaughlin successfully defended his drivers' championship with one event remaining, winning the title for the third consecutive year. DJR Team Penske successfully defended the teams' championship. Ford successfully defended the manufacturers' championship.

Teams and drivers
Holden was represented by factory-backed team Triple Eight Race Engineering respectively.

The following teams and drivers competed in the 2020 championship.

Team changes
Tekno Autosports relocated to Western Sydney and expanded to a two-car operation under the Team Sydney by Tekno brand. A second Racing Entitlement Contract (REC) was acquired from Supercars management. It entered two Triple Eight-built Holden ZB Commodores.

Brad Jones Racing expanded to a three-car team, after acquiring an REC that was formerly owned by Britek Motorsport and had been leased to Matt Stone Racing. Brad Jones Racing continued to operate a fourth car on behalf of Tim Blanchard Racing.

Kelly Racing scaled down from a four-car team racing Nissan Altimas to a two-car team with Ford Mustangs. Two of the team's RECs were purchased by Team 18 and Matt Stone Racing, with both expanding to two car entries. Matt Stone Racing acquired a second REC from Garry Rogers Motorsport to replace the one it had been leasing from Britek Motorsport. Team principal Garry Rogers cited escalating costs of competing and a model that required them to purchase parts rather than develop them as the reasons for his decision to withdraw. Rogers' team later returned to the championship with a single wildcard for the Bathurst 1000 – signing Super2 Series drivers Tyler Everingham and Jayden Ojeda. Nathan Herne from the Australian TA2 Racing Series was originally signed in Ojeda's place however his entry was blocked as Motorsport Australia denied him of the required licence.

Driver changes
Walkinshaw Andretti United fielded a new line-up in 2020 after James Courtney and Scott Pye left the team. Courtney moved to Team Sydney by Tekno, with his seat at Walkinshaw Andretti United filled by Chaz Mostert. Jack Le Brocq left Tekno Autosports and joined Tickford Racing, where he replaced Mostert. Scott Pye joined Team 18 and Walkinshaw Andretti United named reigning Super2 champion Bryce Fullwood as Pye's replacement. Chris Pither returned to the championship on a full-time basis, racing with Team Sydney by Tekno. Pither last competed full-time in 2016. Courtney departed the team after one round.

Zane Goddard and Jake Kostecki graduated from the Super2 Series and make their championship débuts driving for Matt Stone Racing. Goddard and Kostecki will share a car as part of the new SuperLite program, allowing both drivers to compete in five rounds of the series each before teaming up for the Enduro Cup.

Todd Hazelwood left Matt Stone Racing to join Brad Jones Racing. He replaced Tim Slade who will join DJR Team Penske as a co-driver. Jack Smith made his full-time début in the championship with the team. Smith had previously competed for Brad Jones Racing in the Super2 Series and at selected Supercars rounds as a wildcard in 2019.

Richie Stanaway and James Golding left Garry Rogers Motorsport after the team withdrew from the series. Stanaway retired from motorsport, while Golding joined Team 18 for the endurance races.

Simona de Silvestro and Garry Jacobson left Kelly Racing after it scaled down to two cars. De Silvestro returned to Europe to compete in the ADAC GT Masters with Porsche, while Jacobson joined Matt Stone Racing.

Mid-season changes
James Courtney left Team Sydney by Tekno after round one, citing an inability to come to an agreement with the team for the contract to continue. He was replaced by Alex Davison. 23Red Racing withdrew from the series after its primary sponsor withdrew after round 2, leaving Will Davison without a drive. He became a co-driver at the Bathurst 1000 for Tickford Racing after Alexandre Prémat, who resides in Las Vegas, was forced out by COVID-19 travel restrictions. Tickford Racing, which had prepared the car started to lease the REC from 23Red Racing and Car, entered the car as a fourth entry with James Courtney from round three.

Calendar
The 2020 championship was originally due to be contested over twenty-eight races run at fourteen rounds. Due to the COVID-19 pandemic, the Melbourne 400 event was cancelled after practice and qualifying had commenced. With multiple calendar revision during the year, the championship was contested over eleven rounds, although racing only occurred at ten rounds.

Calendar changes

The Sydney SuperNight was originally scheduled to return to the calendar after a one-year absence, but was instead be the first event back after the enforced break due to the COVID-19 pandemic, and ran in daylight hours. Sydney Motorsport Park continued to host the event. The Gold Coast 600 was to have also become a night race. The Auckland Super400 moved from Pukekohe Park Raceway to Hampton Downs Motorsport Park. The change was made in response to Auckland Council passing legislation that prohibited from running any event at the circuit on key dates, with Anzac Day falling on the Saturday of the round.

The Bend 500 was scheduled to replace the Sandown 500 as the opening round the Enduro Cup. The Bend SuperSprint was re-formatted as a 500 kilometre race, while the Sandown round adopted a sprint format, called the Sandown Super400. This resulted in a 500 kilometre being restored as the first race of the Enduro Cup after the Bathurst 1000 was the first endurance race in 2019.

The Ipswich and Phillip Island SuperSprints were removed from the calendar. It was the first time since opening that Queensland Raceway has not been on the calendar and the first since 2004 for Phillip Island Grand Prix Circuit.

Format changes
The Saturday race at the SuperSprint and SuperNight events and the Darwin Triple Crown were due to be extended from 120 kilometres to 200 kilometres.

Proposed changes to the Melbourne 400 and a relocated Sandown 500 to The Bend Motorsport Park did not take place as the events were subsequently cancelled.

Impact of 2019–20 COVID-19 pandemic
The championship was disrupted by the COVID-19 pandemic, with the Melbourne 400 cancelled before the first race of the event. Supercars' management later announced that should an event be postponed, the calendar would have been altered to complete the 2020 fixture, and that a January 2021 finish may have been required to do so. Supercars later announced the postponement of the Launceston, Auckland and Perth rounds due to the pandemic. All three were later cancelled.

The championship recommenced in June with a reformatted round at Sydney Motorsport Park, with the postponed races assigned new dates later in the season. Races at Gold Coast and Newcastle were removed from the schedule.

Due to a spike in COVID-19 cases in Victoria, Sydney Motorsport Park hosted round four of the championship on the weekend of July 18–19 instead of Winton. The event followed the same format as the previous round but featured a night race on the Saturday night and fans were allowed to attend the event. This spike also caused the Sandown event to be removed from the calendar and replaced with two rounds at The Bend Motorsport Park on the weekends of September 19–20 and 26–27. This calendar revision also saw postponed races at Symmons Plains Raceway, Wanneroo Raceway and a scheduled third appearance at Sydney Motorsport Park cancelled.

Rule changes

Technical regulations
The number of engines that a team was allowed to use has been reduced to three, compared with four in 2019 in a bid to reduce costs. The piston ring and rocker ratios became control components and engines must complete  before being rebuilt. Breaking the engine seal before reaching the mileage limit will result in a ten-place grid penalty, similar to Formula One's system of grid penalties for changing engine components. However, engine changes can be made with the approval of Supercars provided that teams present a clear reason for doing so.

A control shock absorber manufactured by Supashock was introduced in a bid to reducing costs. All cars had a reduction of downforce of up to twelve percent, in a bid to improve racing and encourage overtakes. The rear wing angle was be reduced from 18 degrees to 13 degrees, and has gurney flaps of 13 millimetres and 10 millimetres on the wing plane and bootlid respectively. The Mustang's rear wing has also moved forward by 90 millimetres and lowered by 50 millimetres.

LED panels were to be fitted in the windows of all cars. To accommodate this, the car number on the front windscreen moved from the top-right to top-left corner. Originally scheduled to be introduced from the start of the season, due to production delays its introduction was postponed until 2021.

Results and standings

Season summary

Points system
Points were awarded for each race at an event, to the driver or drivers of a car that completed at least 75% of the race distance and was running at the completion of the race. At least 50% of the planned race distance must be completed for the result to be valid and championship points awarded.

Bathurst: Used for the Bathurst 1000.
Adelaide: Used for the Adelaide 500.
SuperSprint: Used for all SuperSprint races and the Darwin Triple Crown.
Melbourne: Used for the Melbourne 400.

Drivers' championship

Teams' championship

Notes

References

Supercars Championship seasons
 
Motorsport events postponed due to the COVID-19 pandemic